Sutton Marks (born July 11, 1928) is an American politician. He served as a member of the Mississippi House of Representatives.

Life and career 
Marks was born in Jackson, Mississippi. He was a business man, president of the Gordon Marks Advertising Agency and chairman of the Jackson church board.

Marks served in the Mississippi House of Representatives from 1960 to 1968.

References 

1928 births
Living people
Politicians from Jackson, Mississippi
Members of the Mississippi House of Representatives
Mississippi Democrats
Mississippi Republicans
20th-century American politicians